Kerry-Anne Guse (4 December 1972) is an Australian tennis player. Born in Brisbane, Queensland, she turned professional at the age of 15. She was coached by her father, Mauri Guse.

WTA Tour finals

Doubles: 13 (6–7)

ITF finals

Singles (7–6)

Doubles (34–11)

References

External links
 
 
 

Living people
1972 births
Australian female tennis players
Tennis people from Queensland